X-Rated Fusion Liqueur is a French vodka and fruit based liqueur, made by the Campari Group. It has a declared alcohol content of 17% alcohol by volume.

First introduced into the U.S. in 2005, X-Rated Fusion Liqueur has subsequently been launched in Japan by Suntory, Canada, and several other countries in Europe and Asia.

In September 2006, X-Rated Fusion Liqueur was named Best New Spirit of the Year by over 250 US retailers for Market Watch Leaders.

Manufacture
X-Rated Fusion Liqueur is a blend of French vodka, Provence blood orange, mango, and passion fruit.

Drinking
X-Rated Fusion Liqueur can be drank over ice or as part of a cocktail.

Cocktails containing X-Rated Fusion Liqueur

X-Rated Flirtini
Tickled Pink 
X-Rated Rita
X-Boyfriend shot

Range development
In 2006, the then brand-owners, Daucourt, introduced a so-called "sister product", X-Rated Vodka, which is based on similar technology to the same company's premium product Jean-Marc XO Vodka.

References

External links
 Brand website
 The Market Watch Announcement about X-Rated Fusion Liqueur being voted Best New Spirit of the Year by over 250 U.S.retailers
 Independent review of X-Rated Fusion Liqueur 
 Suntory Japan announcement for the launch of X-Rated Fusion Liqueur

Fruit liqueurs
French liqueurs
Orange liqueurs
Campari Group